Salvatore Garau (born 1953) is an Italian artist from the Mediterranean island of Sardinia.

Life 

Garau was born in Santa Giusta, in the province of Oristano in the Mediterranean island of Sardinia, Italy. He studied at the Accademia di Belle Arti di Firenze, where he graduated in 1974. In 1977 he became the drummer of the progressive rock group Stormy Six. After the group disbanded he became a visual artist. He had his first solo show in 1984. He participated in the 50th Biennale di Venezia in 2003 and showed work at the European Parliament in Strasbourg in the same year.

In 2005 he painted an abstract work on a  sheet of PVC, which was then hung to cover the scaffolding on a building in Corso Magenta in Milan. For his installation Ichthys Sacro Stagno in Sardinia in 2006 he created large ponds on the floors of three churches in towns in the province of Oristano, which he then populated with fish from nearby ponds.

In 2009 he had a solo show at the Musée d'art moderne et contemporain of Saint-Etienne, in France.

Garau has work in the collections of several museums including the Museo del Novecento (formerly in the Civico Museo d'Arte Contemporanea), the Museo d’Arte Moderna di Bologna and the Padiglione d'Arte Contemporanea in Milan. His 2021 invisible—i.e., nonexistent—sculpture Io sono (I am) sold for €14,820 to a private Milanese collector through Art-Rite Auction House. On the "nothingness" of the sculpture, Garau commented: "The vacuum is nothing more than a space full of energy, and even if we empty it and there is nothing left, according to the Heisenberg uncertainty principle, that 'nothing' has a weight. Therefore, it has energy that is condensed and transformed into particles, that is, into us."

References

Italian painters
1953 births
Accademia di Belle Arti di Firenze alumni
Living people
Italian contemporary artists
Italian conceptual artists
Italian drummers